Mary Moore was a Union nurse during the American Civil War.

Civil War service 
In November 1861, Moore was appointed to hospital matron by Colonel Smith of the 58th regiment of the Illinois Volunteers. She served with the regiment at Camp Douglas, Chicago, until February 1862. She later moved with the regiment to Fort Donelson, Tennessee to work on a hospital steamer. While working at Fort Donelson, Moore would often work for days on no sleep and little food, usually coffee and hardtack.

Moore left the service when her husband died, nine months after she began working in hospitals.

References 

Women in the American Civil War
Year of birth missing
Year of death missing
American Civil War nurses
American women nurses